The 2006 Eisenhower Trophy took place 26–29 October at De Zalze Golf Club and Stellenbosch Golf Club in Stellenbosch, east of Cape Town, South Africa. It was the 25th World Amateur Team Championship for the Eisenhower Trophy. The tournament was a 72-hole stroke play team event with 70 three-man teams. The best two scores for each round counted towards the team total. Each team played two rounds on the two courses. The leading teams played at Stellenbosch Golf Club on the third day and at De Zalze Golf Club on the final day.

The Netherlands won their first Eisenhower Trophy, two strokes ahead of Canada, who took the silver medal. The United States took the bronze medal while Wales finished in fourth place. Wil Besseling had the best 72-hole aggregate of 275, 13 under par. In the last round Joost Luiten had four birdies and an eagle in his last five holes to finish with a 67. He birdied the par-five 14th and then holed a sand-wedge for an eagle two on the 15th and made birdies on the final three holes.

The 2006 Espirito Santo Trophy was played on the same courses one week prior.

Teams
70 teams contested the event. Each team had three played with the exception of Bosnia and Herzegovina and Mauritius who only has two.

The following table lists the players on the leading teams.

Results

Source:

Individual leaders
There was no official recognition for the lowest individual scores.

Source:

References

External links
Record Book on International Golf Federation website 

Eisenhower Trophy
Golf tournaments in South Africa
Eisenhower Trophy
Eisenhower Trophy
Eisenhower Trophy